Greenman is a surname. Notable people with the surname include:

Ben Greenman (born 1969), American writer
Chris Greenman (born 1968), English footballer
David Greenman (born 1977), American actor
Edward W. Greenman (1840–1908), American politician
Leon Greenman (1910–2008), British anti-fascist